Norimoto (written: 則本) is a Japanese surname. Notable people with the surname include:

, Japanese baseball player

Norimoto (written: 紀基) is also masculine Japanese given name. Notable people with the name include:

, Japanese Go player

Japanese-language surnames
Japanese masculine given names